Allopocockiidae is a family of millipedes in the order Spirobolida. There are about five genera and eight described species in Allopocockiidae.

Genera
 Allopocockia Brolemann, 1913
 Anelus Cook, 1911
 Arolus Chamberlin, 1922
 Chelogonobolus Carl, 1919
 Schmidtolus Chamberlin, 1953

References

Further reading

 
 
 
 

Spirobolida
Millipede families